Międzyzakładowy Ludowy Klub Sportowy Kujawianka Strzelno is a football club from Strzelno, Poland. It was found in 1922.They're currently playing in A-klasa (VII level)

References
 info about club on 90minut.pl

External links
 Unofficial website

Association football clubs established in 1922
Mogilno County
Football clubs in Kuyavian-Pomeranian Voivodeship
1922 establishments in Poland